The M.G.R. Government Film and Television Training Institute, formerly known as the Adyar Film Institute, is Asia's first-ever film and television training institute. Established in 1945 as Adyar Film Institute, it is one of the pioneer film institutes in India, It is in Tharamani, Chennai, and is run by the Tamil Nadu State Government under the Department of Information and Public Relations.

It offers four-year bachelor's degree courses 
 Screenplay and Direction, Cinematography, Sound Recording and Sound Engineering, Film Editing and Film Processing, and functions of the government. Only 14 students are admitted in each course.

The diplomas are approved by All India Council for Technical Education (AICTE), while the certificates are awarded by the Department of Technical Education, Government of Tamil Nadu.

The chief minister of Tamil Nadu, M. K. Stalin, appointed actor Rajesh as the Head of the Institute in Sep 2022.

History
The institute was established in 1945 as Adyar Film Institute and was a part of the Central Polytechnic. In 1965, it moved into its present campus in the Tharamani area of Chennai. At the time, the campus was spread over 54 acres, which has reduced over the following decades, due to rapid urbanisation. Parts of land were given to the IIT Madras and many IT companies, bringing it down to the present 10 acres.

A full-fledged "Film City" in the country, situated amidst sylvan surroundings and serene atmosphere at Chennai, is being inaugurated on 31 August 1994, in a true manner by the then chief minister late J. Jayalalitha. The Film City with its 21 crore rupees worth of comprehensive infrastructural facilities encompassing all aspects of moviemaking. One can enter and can exit with a completed film.

M.G.R. Film City is situated in Taramani. It is an Indian Film and TV Training Institute run by Tamil Nadu State Government under Information and Public relation.

A Dream World that's dotting a living landscape has been the vision of the mighty architect of Tamil Nadu's progress, Dr. J.Jayalalitha, the Honorable Chief Minister of Tamil Nadu. After completion of this dream world and named J. Jayalalitha Film City. The grandeur and scale of the project have been inspired by her intellect and imagination and is an example of her creative spirit.

The Film City has everything for the dream merchants to spin their web of fantasy tales. Their wildest imagination can be realised here on the "silver screen". These settings and locales cascade into a world of equipment and technology which reveal the level of sophistication seen only in the finest studios of the world. There were airconditioned shooting floor, editing lab, recording studio, preview theatre, makeup room, central jail, police station, courtyard, and Japanese home. These settings play an important role in TV productions and Indian Films.

In 2006, it was renamed M.G.R. Film and Television Training Institute, after former Chief Minister of Tamil Nadu M. G. Ramachandran (1917–1987), who was a prominent actor in Tamil cinema.

In 1994, the government started MGR Film City to make more filmmaking facilities in the city. On 16 October 1997, Queen Elizabeth II visited MGR Film City and watched the filming of Kamal Haasan's Tamil movie Marudhanayagam. The acting course that started in 1971, at the behest of M.G.R., was discontinued in 2002. Talks to revive the course have been on for many years.

Notable alumni

See also
 Film and Television Institute of India
 Bhartendu Natya Academy
 Cinema of India
 Film and Television Institute of India alumni
 Film school
 Satyajit Ray Film and Television Institute
 Government Film and Television Institute
 State Institute of Film and Television
 Jyoti Chitraban Film and Television Institute
 Biju Pattnaik Film and Television Institute of Odisha
 K. R. Narayanan National Institute of Visual Science and Arts

References

External links
 M.G.R. Government Film and Television Training Institute at Government of Tamil Nadu website

Film schools in India
Educational institutions established in 1945
1945 establishments in India
State agencies of Tamil Nadu